The 2017–18 Milwaukee Bucks season was the 50th season of the franchise in the National Basketball Association (NBA). On June 16, 2017, the Bucks named Jon Horst as their new general manager. This was the Bucks' final season at the Bradley Center, with their move to the new Fiserv Forum beginning with the 2018–19 NBA season. On January 22, 2018, the Bucks fired head coach Jason Kidd and replaced him with the team's assistant head coach Joe Prunty as interim head coach.

They finished the regular season with 44–38, which clinched the 7th seed. In the playoffs, the Bucks faced the 2nd seeded Boston Celtics in the First Round, and lost in seven games.

Draft picks

Roster

<noinclude>

Standings

Division

Conference

Game log

Preseason

|- style="background:#fcc"
| 1
| October 2
| @ Dallas
| 
| Rashad Vaughn (20)
| Monroe, Teletovic (7)
| Kendall Marshall (10)
| American Airlines Center16,223
| 0–1
|- style="background:#fcc"
| 2
| October 4
| Indiana
| 
| Gary Payton II (15)
| Gary Payton II (7)
| Gary Payton II (5)
| Bradley Center6,691
| 0–2
|- style="background:#fcc"
| 3
| October 6
| @ Chicago
| 
| Giannis Antetokounmpo (24)
| Brown, Henson, Monroe (5)
| Brogdon, Middleton (5)
| United Center17,187
| 0–3
|- style="background:#cfc"
| 4
| October 13
| Detroit
| 
| Giannis Antetokounmpo (17)
| Thon Maker (8)
| Matthew Dellavedova (7)
| Bradley Center9,528
| 1–3

Regular season

|- style="background:#cfc"
| 1
| October 18
| @ Boston
| 
| Giannis Antetokounmpo (37)
| Giannis Antetokounmpo (13)
| Khris Middleton (6)
| TD Garden18,624
| 1–0
|- style="background:#fcc"
| 2
| October 20
| Cleveland
| 
| Giannis Antetokounmpo (34)
| Giannis Antetokounmpo (8)
| Giannis Antetokounmpo (8)
| Bradley Center18,717
| 1–1
|- style="background:#cfc"
| 3
| October 21
| Portland
| 
| Giannis Antetokounmpo (44)
| John Henson (9)
| Malcolm Brogdon (6)
| Bradley Center16,211
| 2–1
|- style="background:#cfc"
| 4
| October 23
| Charlotte
| 
| Giannis Antetokounmpo (32)
| Giannis Antetokounmpo (14)
| Matthew Dellavedova (9)
| Bradley Center12,887
| 3–1
|- style="background:#fcc"
| 5
| October 26
| Boston
| 
| Giannis Antetokounmpo (28)
| Giannis Antetokounmpo (10)
| Giannis Antetokounmpo (7)
| UW–Milwaukee Panther Arena11,046
| 3–2
|- style="background:#cfc"
| 6
| October 29
| @ Atlanta
| 
| Giannis Antetokounmpo (33)
| Giannis Antetokounmpo (11)
| Khris Middleton (9)
| Philips Arena14,014
| 4–2
|- style="background:#fcc"
| 7
| October 31
| Oklahoma City
| 
| Giannis Antetokounmpo (28)
| Giannis Antetokounmpo (8)
| Tony Snell (5)
| Bradley Center16,713
| 4–3

|- style="background:#fcc"
| 8
| November 1
| @ Charlotte
| 
| Khris Middleton (43)
| Giannis Antetokounmpo (13)
| Khris Middleton (7)
| Spectrum Center15,655
| 4–4
|- style="background:#fcc"
| 9
| November 3
| @ Detroit
| 
| Giannis Antetokounmpo (29)
| John Henson (13)
| Malcolm Brogdon (10)
| Little Caesars Arena17,207
| 4–5
|- style="background:#fcc"
| 10
| November 7
| @ Cleveland
| 
| Giannis Antetokounmpo (40)
| Giannis Antetokounmpo (9)
| Khris Middleton (11)
| Quicken Loans Arena20,562
| 4–6
|- style="background:#cfc"
| 11
| November 10
| @ San Antonio
| 
| Giannis Antetokounmpo (28)
| Giannis Antetokounmpo (12)
| Eric Bledsoe (7)
| AT&T Center18,418
| 5–6
|- style="background:#cfc"
| 12
| November 11
| L.A. Lakers
| 
| Giannis Antetokounmpo (32)
| Giannis Antetokounmpo (15)
| Khris Middleton (4)
| Bradley Center18,717
| 6–6
|- style="background:#cfc"
| 13
| November 13
| Memphis
| 
| Giannis Antetokounmpo (27)
| Giannis Antetokounmpo (9)
| Giannis Antetokounmpo (7)
| Bradley Center13,244
| 7–6
|- style="background:#cfc"
| 14
| November 15
| Detroit
| 
| Khris Middleton (27)
| John Henson (10)
| Antetokounmpo, Bledsoe (8)
| Bradley Center14,594
| 8–6
|- style="background:#fcc"
| 15
| November 18
| @ Dallas
| 
| Giannis Antetokounmpo (24)
| Giannis Antetokounmpo (17)
| Eric Bledsoe (4)
| American Airlines Center19,949
| 8–7
|- style="background:#fcc"
| 16
| November 20
| Washington
| 
| Giannis Antetokounmpo (23)
| John Henson (10)
| Giannis Antetokounmpo (4)
| Bradley Center16,122
| 8–8
|- style="background:#cfc"
| 17
| November 22
| @ Phoenix
| 
| Khris Middleton (40)
| Khris Middleton (9)
| Eric Bledsoe (7)
| Talking Stick Resort Arena16,270
| 9–8
|- style="background:#fcc"
| 18
| November 25
| @ Utah
| 
| Giannis Antetokounmpo (27)
| Giannis Antetokounmpo (13)
| Eric Bledsoe (7)
| Vivint Smart Home Arena17,298
| 9–9
|- style="background:#cfc"
| 19
| November 28
| @ Sacramento
| 
| Giannis Antetokounmpo (32)
| Malcolm Brogdon (6)
| Bledsoe, Brogdon (5)
| Golden 1 Center17,583
| 10–9
|- style="background:#cfc"
| 20
| November 30
| @ Portland
| 
| Khris Middleton (26)
| John Henson (10)
| Giannis Antetokounmpo (5)
| Moda Center19,459
| 11–9

|- style="background:#cfc"
| 21
| December 2
| Sacramento
| 
| Giannis Antetokounmpo (33)
| Giannis Antetokounmpo (13)
| Antetokounmpo, Brogdon (5)
| Bradley Center15,581
| 12–9
|- style="background:#fcc"
| 22
| December 4
| @ Boston
| 
| Giannis Antetokounmpo (40)
| Giannis Antetokounmpo (9)
| Khris Middleton (5)
| TD Garden18,624
| 12–10
|- style="background:#cfc"
| 23
| December 6
| Detroit
| 
| Giannis Antetokounmpo (25)
| Giannis Antetokounmpo (9)
| Khris Middleton (6)
| Bradley Center15,841
| 13–10
|- style="background:#cfc"
| 24
| December 8
| Dallas
| 
| Giannis Antetokounmpo (27)
| Giannis Antetokounmpo (11)
| Malcolm Brogdon (6)
| Bradley Center15,889
| 14–10
|- style="background:#cfc"
| 25
| December 9
| Utah
| 
| Giannis Antetokounmpo (37)
| Giannis Antetokounmpo (13)
| Giannis Antetokounmpo (7)
| Bradley Center16,675
| 15–10
|- style="background:#fcc"
| 26
| December 13
| @ New Orleans
| 
| Giannis Antetokounmpo (32)
| Giannis Antetokounmpo (9)
| Khris Middleton (10)
| Smoothie King Center16,863
| 15–11
|- style="background:#fcc"
| 27
| December 15
| Chicago
| 
| Antetokounmpo, Middleton (29)
| Giannis Antetokounmpo (16)
| Eric Bledsoe (7)
| Bradley Center16,921
| 15–12
|- style="background:#fcc"
| 28
| December 16
| @ Houston
| 
| Giannis Antetokounmpo (28)
| Giannis Antetokounmpo (9)
| Giannis Antetokounmpo (5)
| Toyota Center18,055
| 15–13
|- style="background:#cfc"
| 29
| December 19
| Cleveland
| 
| Giannis Antetokounmpo (27)
| Giannis Antetokounmpo (14)
| Khris Middleton (10)
| Bradley Center18,717
| 16–13
|- style="background:#cfc"
| 30
| December 22
| Charlotte
| 
| Khris Middleton (28)
| John Henson (8)
| Eric Bledsoe (10)
| Bradley Center17,018
| 17–13
|- style="background:#fcc"
| 31
| December 23
| @ Charlotte
| 
| Khris Middleton (31)
| Eric Bledsoe (7)
| Eric Bledsoe (6)
| Spectrum Center18,363
| 17–14
|- style="background:#fcc"
| 32
| December 26
| Chicago
| 
| Giannis Antetokounmpo (28)
| Antetokounmpo, Snell (7)
| Eric Bledsoe (6)
| Bradley Center18,717
| 17–15
|- style="background:#cfc"
| 33
| December 28
| Minnesota
| 
| Eric Bledsoe (26)
| Giannis Antetokounmpo (10)
| Eric Bledsoe (6)
| Bradley Center18,717
| 18–15
|- style="background:#cfc"
| 34
| December 29
| @ Oklahoma City
| 
| Giannis Antetokounmpo (23)
| Giannis Antetokounmpo (12)
| Matthew Dellavedova (9)
| Chesapeake Energy Arena18,203
| 19–15

|- style="background:#fcc"
| 35
| January 1
| @ Toronto
| 
| Eric Bledsoe (29)
| Giannis Antetokounmpo (9)
| Matthew Dellavedova (10)
| Air Canada Centre19,800
| 19–16
|- style="background:#cfc"
| 36
| January 3
| Indiana
| 
| Giannis Antetokounmpo (31)
| Giannis Antetokounmpo (10)
| Matthew Dellavedova (9)
| Bradley Center15,613
| 20–16
|- style="background:#fcc"
| 37
| January 5
| Toronto
| 
| Giannis Antetokounmpo (24)
| Thon Maker (8)
| Dellavedova, Middleton (7)
| Bradley Center18,717
| 20–17
|- style="background:#cfc"
| 38
| January 6
| @ Washington
| 
| Giannis Antetokounmpo (34)
| Giannis Antetokounmpo (12)
| Giannis Antetokounmpo (7)
| Capital One Arena18,762
| 21–17
|- style="background:#fcc"
| 39
| January 8
| @ Indiana
| 
| Khris Middleton (19)
| Giannis Antetokounmpo (7)
| Brogdon, Middleton (4)
| Bankers Life Fieldhouse14,670
| 21–18
|- style="background:#cfc"
| 40
| January 10
| Orlando
| 
| Giannis Antetokounmpo (26)
| John Henson (10)
| Malcolm Brogdon (7)
| Bradley Center14,543
| 22–18
|- style="background:#fcc"
| 41
| January 12
| Golden State
| 
| Giannis Antetokounmpo (23)
| John Henson (8)
| Antetokounmpo, Brogdon,Dellavedova, Middleton (4)
| Bradley Center18,717
| 22–19
|- style="background:#fcc"
| 42
| January 14
| @ Miami
| 
| Giannis Antetokounmpo (22)
| John Henson (9)
| Eric Bledsoe (4)
| American Airlines Arena19,600
| 22–20
|- style="background:#cfc"
| 43
| January 15
| @ Washington
| 
| Giannis Antetokounmpo (27)
| Giannis Antetokounmpo (20)
| Giannis Antetokounmpo (6)
| Capital One Arena19,607
| 23–20
|- style="background:#fcc"
| 44
| January 17
| Miami
| 
| Khris Middleton (25)
| Antetokounmpo, Henson (10)
| Giannis Antetokounmpo (6)
| Bradley Center16,695
| 23–21
|- style="background:#fcc"
| 45
| January 20
| @ Philadelphia
| 
| Khris Middleton (23)
| Khris Middleton (14)
| Khris Middleton (10)
| Wells Fargo Center20,826
| 23–22
|- style="background:#cfc"
| 46
| January 22
| Phoenix
| 
| Khris Middleton (35)
| Henson, Middleton (6)
| Eric Bledsoe (7)
| Bradley Center14,766
| 24–22
|- style="background:#cfc"
| 47
| January 26
| Brooklyn
| 
| Giannis Antetokounmpo (41)
| Giannis Antetokounmpo (13)
| Giannis Antetokounmpo (4)
| Bradley Center18,717
| 25–22
|- style="background:#cfc"
| 48
| January 28
| @ Chicago
| 
| Giannis Antetokounmpo (27)
| Giannis Antetokounmpo (9)
| Giannis Antetokounmpo (8)
| United Center21,630
| 26–22
|- style="background:#cfc"
| 49
| January 29
| Philadelphia
| 
| Giannis Antetokounmpo (31)
| Giannis Antetokounmpo (18)
| Antetokounmpo, Middleton (6)
| Bradley Center14,126
| 27–22

|- style="background:#fcc"
| 50
| February 1
| @ Minnesota
| 
| Khris Middleton (21)
| Giannis Antetokounmpo (15)
| Giannis Antetokounmpo (6)
| Target Center17,199
| 27–23
|- style="background:#cfc"
| 51
| February 2
| New York
| 
| Giannis Antetokounmpo (29)
| Giannis Antetokounmpo (11)
| Khris Middleton (5)
| Bradley Center18,717
| 28–23
|- style="background:#cfc"
| 52
| February 4
| @ Brooklyn
| 
| Eric Bledsoe (28)
| John Henson (18)
| Eric Bledsoe (6)
| Barclays Center14,392
| 29–23
|- style="background:#cfc"
| 53
| February 6
| @ New York
| 
| Antetokounmpo, Bledsoe (23)
| Giannis Antetokounmpo (11)
| Eric Bledsoe (8)
| Madison Square Garden19,812
| 30–23
|- style="background:#fcc"
| 54
| February 9
| @ Miami
| 
| Giannis Antetokounmpo (23)
| Giannis Antetokounmpo (11)
| Eric Bledsoe (6)
| American Airlines Arena20,018
| 30–24
|- style="background:#cfc"
| 55
| February 10
| @ Orlando
| 
| Giannis Antetokounmpo (32)
| Khris Middleton (9)
| Eric Bledsoe (8)
| Amway Center18,347
| 31–24
|- style="background:#cfc"
| 56
| February 13
| Atlanta
| 
| Khris Middleton (21)
| Giannis Antetokounmpo (15)
| Eric Bledsoe (9)
| Bradley Center14,720
| 32–24
|- style="background:#fcc"
| 57
| February 15
| Denver
| 
| Giannis Antetokounmpo (36)
| Giannis Antetokounmpo (11)
| Giannis Antetokounmpo (13)
| Bradley Center15,486
| 32–25
|- style="background:#cfc"
| 58
| February 23
| @ Toronto
| 
| Giannis Antetokounmpo (26)
| Giannis Antetokounmpo (12)
| Giannis Antetokounmpo (6)
| Air Canada Centre20,047
| 33–25
|- style="background:#fcc"
| 59
| February 25
| New Orleans
| 
| Khris Middleton (25)
| Eric Bledsoe (9)
| Giannis Antetokounmpo (6)
| Bradley Center18,717
| 33–26
|- style="background:#fcc"
| 60
| February 27
| Washington
| 
| Giannis Antetokounmpo (23)
| Giannis Antetokounmpo (13)
| Giannis Antetokounmpo (8)
| Bradley Center16,093
| 33–27
|- style="background:#fcc"
| 61
| February 28
| @ Detroit
| 
| Eric Bledsoe (19)
| Eric Bledsoe (6)
| Eric Bledsoe (4)
| Little Caesars Arena16,146
| 33–28

|- style="background:#fcc"
| 62
| March 2
| Indiana
| 
| Khris Middleton (30)
| Antetokounmpo, Henson (10)
| Eric Bledsoe (6)
| Bradley Center17,217
| 33–29
|- style="background:#cfc"
| 63
| March 4
| Philadelphia
| 
| Giannis Antetokounmpo (35)
| Giannis Antetokounmpo (9)
| Giannis Antetokounmpo (7)
| Bradley Center15,587
| 34–29
|- style="background:#fcc"
| 64
| March 5
| @ Indiana
| 
| Eric Bledsoe (26)
| Giannis Antetokounmpo (10)
| Giannis Antetokounmpo (12)
| Bankers Life Fieldhouse15,874
| 34–30
|- style="background:#fcc"
| 65
| March 7
| Houston
| 
| Giannis Antetokounmpo (30)
| Khris Middleton (12)
| Middleton, Terry (5)
| Bradley Center17,195
| 34–31
|- style="background:#cfc"
| 66
| March 9
| New York
| 
| Giannis Antetokounmpo (28)
| Giannis Antetokounmpo (10)
| Eric Bledsoe (8)
| Bradley Center18,717
| 35–31
|- style="background:#cfc"
| 67
| March 12
| @ Memphis
| 
| Giannis Antetokounmpo (24)
| Brandon Jennings (8)
| Brandon Jennings (12)
| FedExForum14,112
| 36–31
|- style="background:#fcc"
| 68
| March 14
| @ Orlando
| 
| Giannis Antetokounmpo (33)
| Giannis Antetokounmpo (10)
| Eric Bledsoe (8)
| Amway Center17,713
| 36–32
|- style="background:#cfc"
| 69
| March 17
| Atlanta
| 
| Giannis Antetokounmpo (33)
| Giannis Antetokounmpo (12)
| Eric Bledsoe (9)
| Bradley Center18,717
| 37–32
|- style="background:#fcc"
| 70
| March 19
| @ Cleveland
| 
| Giannis Antetokounmpo (37)
| Giannis Antetokounmpo (11)
| Eric Bledsoe (8)
| Quicken Loans Arena20,562
| 37–33
|- style="background:#fcc"
| 71
| March 21
| L.A. Clippers
| 
| Khris Middleton (23)
| John Henson (7)
| Eric Bledsoe (8)
| Bradley Center17,916
| 37–34
|- style="background:#cfc"
| 72
| March 23
| @ Chicago
| 
| Shabazz Muhammad (21)
| John Henson (12)
| Khris Middleton (6)
| United Center21,698
| 38–34
|- style="background:#cfc"
| 73
| March 25
| San Antonio
| 
| Giannis Antetokounmpo (25)
| Giannis Antetokounmpo (10)
| Eric Bledsoe (5)
| Bradley Center18,717
| 39–34
|- style="background:#fcc"
| 74
| March 27
| @ L.A. Clippers
| 
| Giannis Antetokounmpo (26)
| Antetokounmpo, Bledsoe (9)
| Giannis Antetokounmpo (7)
| Staples Center19,068
| 39–35
|- style="background:#cfc"
| 75
| March 29
| @ Golden State
| 
| Giannis Antetokounmpo (32)
| Tyler Zeller (8)
| Eric Bledsoe (6)
| Oracle Arena19,596
| 40–35
|- style="background:#cfc"
| 76
| March 30
| @ L.A. Lakers
| 
| Giannis Antetokounmpo (27)
| Giannis Antetokounmpo (16)
| Eric Bledsoe (6)
| Staples Center18,997
| 41–35

|- style="background:#fcc"
| 77
| April 1
| @ Denver
| 
| Jabari Parker (35)
| Giannis Antetokounmpo (12)
| Bledsoe, Antetokounmpo (6)
| Pepsi Center19,520
| 41–36
|- style="background:#cfc"
| 78
| April 3
| Boston
| 
| Giannis Antetokounmpo (29)
| Giannis Antetokounmpo (11)
| Khris Middleton (9)
| Bradley Center16,188
| 42–36
|- style="background:#fcc"
| 79
| April 5
| Brooklyn
| 
| Khris Middleton (31)
| Giannis Antetokounmpo (10)
| Giannis Antetokounmpo (7)
| Bradley Center18,378
| 42–37
|- style="background:#cfc"
| 80
| April 7
| @ New York
| 
| Bledsoe, Middleton (22)
| Henson, Parker (12)
| Eric Bledsoe (10)
| Madison Square Garden19,812
| 43–37
|- style="background:#cfc"
| 81
| April 9
| Orlando
| 
| Shabazz Muhammad (22)
| Eric Bledsoe (11)
| Eric Bledsoe (10)
| Bradley Center18,717
| 44–37
|- style="background:#fcc"
| 82
| April 11
| @ Philadelphia
| 
| Jabari Parker (25)
| Giannis Antetokounmpo (10)
| Brandon Jennings (5)
| Wells Fargo Center20,659
| 44–38

Playoffs

|- style="background:#fcc;"
| 1
| April 15
| @ Boston
| 
| Giannis Antetokounmpo (35)
| Giannis Antetokounmpo (13)
| Giannis Antetokounmpo (7)
| TD Garden18,624
| 0–1
|- style="background:#fcc;"
| 2
| April 17
| @ Boston
| 
| Giannis Antetokounmpo (35)
| Giannis Antetokounmpo (9)
| Giannis Antetokounmpo (8)
| TD Garden18,624
| 0–2
|- style="background:#cfc;"
| 3
| April 20
| Boston
| 
| Khris Middleton (23)
| Khris Middleton (7)
| Khris Middleton (7)
| Bradley Center18,717
| 1–2
|- style="background:#cfc;"
| 4
| April 22
| Boston
| 
| Giannis Antetokounmpo (27)
| Antetokounmpo, Parker (7)
| Antetokounmpo, Bledsoe (5)
| Bradley Center18,717
| 2–2
|- style="background:#fcc;"
| 5
| April 24
| @ Boston
| 
| Khris Middleton (23)
| Giannis Antetokounmpo (10)
| Giannis Antetokounmpo (9)
| TD Garden18,624
| 2–3
|- style="background:#cfc;"
| 6
| April 26
| Boston
| 
| Giannis Antetokounmpo (31)
| Giannis Antetokounmpo (14)
| Matthew Dellavedova (6)
| Bradley Center18,717
| 3–3
|- style="background:#fcc;"
| 7
| April 28
| @ Boston
| 
| Khris Middleton (32)
| Giannis Antetokounmpo (9)
| Giannis Antetokounmpo (5)
| TD Garden18,624
| 3–4

Transactions

Trades

Free agency

Re-signed

Additions

Subtractions

References

Milwaukee Bucks seasons
Milwaukee Bucks
Milwaukee Bucks
Milwaukee Bucks